KDLP-LP (104.7 FM) was a low power radio station broadcasting a country music format. Licensed to Ace, Texas, United States. The station was owned by Ace Radio Inc. The station license was cancelled by the FCC by the licensee's request.

References

External links
 

Country radio stations in the United States
DLP-LP
DLP-LP
Radio stations established in 2003
2003 establishments in Texas
Defunct radio stations in the United States
Radio stations disestablished in 2013
2013 disestablishments in Texas
DLP-LP